Merey may refer to:

People
 Edna Merey-Apinda (born 1976), Gabonese writer
 Jane Mérey (1872–?), Belgian opera singer
 Kajetan von Mérey (1861–1931), Austro-Hungarian diplomat
 Merey Akshalov (born 1989), Kazakhstani boxer
 Mihály Mérey (1500–1572), Hungarian jurist and noble
 Victor Merey, Arab-Israeli football player

Places
 Merey, Eure, commune in the Eure department of the Normandy region in northern France
 Mérey-Vieilley, commune in the Doubs department in the Bourgogne-Franche-Comté region in eastern France
 Mérey-sous-Montrond, commune in the Doubs department in the Bourgogne-Franche-Comté region in eastern France

Other
 Merey language, Afro-Asiatic language spoken in northern Cameroon